Diocles may refer to:

People
Diocles (mathematician) (c. 240 BC–c. 180 BC), Greek mathematician and geometer
Diocles (mythology), one of the first priests of Demeter
Diocles of Carystus (4th century BC), also known as Diocles Medicus, Greek physician
Diocles of Cnidus (3rd or 2nd century BC), Greek philosopher who wrote a work quoted by Eusebius
Diocles of Corinth, winner of the stadion race of the 13th Olympic Games in 728 BC
Diocles of Magnesia (2nd or 1st century BC), Greek writer on ancient philosophers quoted many times by Diogenes Laertius
Diocles of Megara, ancient Greek warrior from Athens
Diocles of Messenia, winner of the stadion race of the 7th Olympic Games in 752 BC
Diocles of Peparethus (3rd century BC), Greek historian
Diocles of Phlius (fl. ), comic poet
Diocles of Syracuse (fl. 413–408 BC), Greek lawgiver in the city-state of Syracuse
Diocletian (244–311), Roman emperor formerly named Diocles
Diocles (1st century BC), or Tyrannion the Younger
Gaius Appuleius Diocles (104–after 146 AD), Roman charioteer

Other
Diocles laser, a laser that uses Chirped pulse amplification at the University of Nebraska–Lincoln